Filip Faletar (born 2 April 1995 in Austria) is an Austrian footballer.

References

Austrian footballers
Association football midfielders
Association football wingers
Living people
1995 births
RNK Split players
SV Horn players
NK Imotski players
SC Wiener Neustadt players